Peepholes were a British musical duo made up of Nick Carlisle and Katia Barrett. They formed in Brighton around 2007/8 and released the albums Caligula (2011) and The Overspill! (2012) on Upset the Rhythm.

Discography

Albums
a.P.A.t.T. / Peepholes (Upset the Rhythm, 2010) – split with APAtT
Caligula (Upset! The Rhythm, 2011)
The Overspill! (Upset! The Rhythm, 2012)

EPs
Lair (Hungry For Power, 2010)

See also
Bamboo (British band) – another duo with Carlisle

References

External links

British musical duos
British experimental musical groups
Musical groups from Brighton and Hove